Hadzi may refer to:

 Dimitri Hadzi, an American abstract sculptor
 Hadži, an honorific used in Orthodox Christianity in the Balkan countries, related to the Muslim honorary title Hajji